Bertram Tollett Gilboy (15 August 1894 – March 1974), sometimes mistaken as Gilroy, was an English professional footballer who played for Southend United, Huddersfield Town, Preston North End, Swansea Town, Brentford and Gillingham, before ending his football career at Treherbert.

Personal life 
Gilboy served as a gunner in the Royal Garrison Artillery and the Labour Corps during the First World War.

Career statistics

References

1894 births
1974 deaths
English footballers
Footballers from Islington (district)
Association football forwards
English Football League players
Southend United F.C. players
Huddersfield Town A.F.C. players
Preston North End F.C. players
Brentford F.C. players
British Army personnel of World War I
Royal Garrison Artillery soldiers
Royal Pioneer Corps soldiers
Military personnel from London